The 1994 Supercopa Libertadores Finals was the two-legged football series to decide a winner of the 1994 Supercopa Libertadores. It was contested by two Argentine teams, Independiente and Boca Juniors, which met in a final again after their first series in 1989.

In the first leg, played in La Bombonera in Buenos Aires, both teams tied 1–1. In the second leg, played in La Doble Visera in Avellaneda, Independiente won 1–0, taking revenge from the previous final in order to claim their first Supercopa Libertadores title.

Qualified teams

Road to the final

Match details

First leg

Second leg

References

1
Football in Buenos Aires
Football in Avellaneda
s
s
Supercopa Libertadores Finals